¡Ándale, Prieta! A Love Letter to My Family is a 2022 memoir by Yasmín Ramírez, a Mexican–American writer and associate professor of English and creative writing at El Paso Community College. She was motivated to write the memoir after the death of her maternal grandmother, Ita.

Synopsis

In the book, Ramírez tells about growing up in El Paso, Texas. The stars of the book are the women in her life: her great grandmother Lupe, her mother Leticia, and most importantly, her grandmother Ita.

In the second half of the book she also explores her strained relationship with her absent father.

The title reclaims the sometimes derogatory term , which her grandmother used as a nickname for the author, but which is often used in Spanish as a slur to describe people with dark skin.

Reception

Kirkus Reviews praised the book's "vivid imagery" and declared it to be a "promising debut". Book Riot selected ¡Ándale, Prieta! as a "Most Anticipated Book of 2022" and praised the writing for being both "rich" and "casual".

Author

Ramírez completed an MFA in the Bilingual Creative Writing program at the University of Texas at El Paso. She is an associate professor of English and creative writing at El Paso Community College. She has published a number of short stories and was a 2021 Martha's Vineyard Institute of Creative Writing Writing Author Fellow.

¡Ándale, Prieta! started as her thesis and took four or five years to complete.

References

External links 
 Official book website
 Author's website

Debut books
2022 non-fiction books
American memoirs
Hispanic and Latino American literature
Literature by Hispanic and Latino American women
Books about Texas
Mexican-American culture in Texas
Mexican-American literature
Books about race and ethnicity
Cinco Puntos Press books